John Procter may refer to:

 John Procter (politician) (born 1966), British politician
 John Robert Procter (1844–1933), American geologist
 John Procter, musician in I, Ludicrous
 John Procter, see List of Grand National winners

See also
 John Proctor (disambiguation)